Murricia crinifera, is a species of spider of the genus Murricia. It is endemic to Sri Lanka. The species was described with a female specimen collected from Kandy, Galle and Colombo.

See also
 List of Hersiliidae species

References

Hersiliidae
Endemic fauna of Sri Lanka
Spiders of Asia
Spiders described in 1993